The fifth season of Madam Secretary an American political drama television series, originally aired in the United States on CBS from October 7, 2018, through April 21, 2019. This season was produced by CBS Television Studios, with Barbara Hall and Lori McCreary serving as showrunner and executive producer, respectively. Madam Secretary was renewed for a fifth season on April 18, 2018. In May 2019, Madam Secretary was renewed for a sixth and final season.

Cast and characters

Main
 Téa Leoni as Elizabeth McCord, the United States Secretary of State
 Tim Daly as Henry McCord, Elizabeth's husband and a Central Intelligence Agency operative
Erich Bergen as Blake Moran, Elizabeth's personal assistant and later deputy policy advisor.
Željko Ivanek as Russell Jackson, White House Chief of Staff
Wallis Currie-Wood as Stephanie "Stevie" McCord, Elizabeth and Henry's older daughter; later, Dmitri's girlfriend
Patina Miller as Daisy Grant, Elizabeth's press coordinator
Evan Roe as Jason McCord, Elizabeth and Henry's son
Geoffrey Arend as Matt Mahoney, Elizabeth's speechwriter
Katherine Herzer as Alison McCord, Elizabeth and Henry's younger daughter
 Keith Carradine as Conrad Dalton, President of the United States
Sebastian Arcelus as Jay Whitman, Elizabeth's chief of staff (Previously policy advisor)
 Sara Ramirez as Kat Sandoval, Elizabeth's new policy advisor
 Chris Petrovski as Dmitri Petrov, a former Russian spy who joins the Central Intelligence Agency to work for Henry

Guests
 Madeleine Albright as herself, a former U.S. Secretary of State
 Hillary Clinton as herself, a former U.S. Secretary of State
 Colin Powell as himself, a former U.S. Secretary of State
 Ali Olomi as Baddar Nabi

Episodes

Production
Madam Secretary was renewed for a fifth season on April 18, 2018. On May 9, 2019, it was renewed for a sixth season. On May 15, it was revealed the sixth season, to consist of 10 episodes, would be the series' last.

Broadcast
Season five of Madam Secretary premiered on October 7, 2018.

Ratings

References

External links

Season 5
2018 American television seasons
2019 American television seasons